The New Synagogue (Slovak: Nová Synagóga) of  Žilina, Slovakia, was constructed between 1928 and 1931 to the designs of the German modernist architect Peter Behrens. It is sometimes referred to as the Neological or Neolog Synagogue (Slovak: Neologická synagóga or Synagóga Neológov), as it housed the Neolog (Reform Judaism) congregation of the town. Completed eight years before World War II, which almost obliterated the Jewish population of Slovakia, it has been called "the last Slovak synagogue". Having been used for other purposes after WW2, it was restored 2011-17 to become an arts centre.

History
The town of Žilina had been resistant to Jewish settlers and by the middle of the nineteenth century, only two Jewish families lived there. An early synagogue of c. 1860 was replaced by a new one in 1880. The Jewish community in Žilina continued to grow, reaching about 3,000 in the early 1930s. During the 1920s an international competition was launched for a modern synagogue for the Reform Judaism congregation; competitors included Lipot Baumhorn and Josef Hoffmann. The competition was won by the architect and designer Peter Behrens (1868–1940) and the synagogue was constructed between 1928 and 1931. In 1934 Behrens joined the Nazi Party and later worked on Hitler's plans for redesigning Berlin.

After World War II, from which only 600 Jews returned to the city, the building was taken over by the town for cultural purposes, including an assembly hall for Žilina University and a cinema.

Since 2012 the synagogue has been under restoration for use as an art gallery and cultural centre. From 2014, the work has carried out by the NGO Truc sphérique, with the aid of an EEA grant from Norway, Liechtenstein and Iceland and with the support of the town of Žilina and the town's remaining Jewish community. Work has included  restoration of wall surfaces in the interior and the façade of the building. The synagogue building has been open for events from August 2016 and the restoration was completed in July 2017.

Design
The synagogue was built to accommodate 450 men in the prayer hall with 350 women in the galleries. The hall features high, narrow windows. The dome over the hall has a diameter of 16 metres and a height of 17.6 metres. The low front entrance is accessed by a flight of steps from street level. The front facade was considerably altered in the period 1945-1980. The congregational hall retained its domed structure, but the women's galleries which lined the upper storey were removed. The present restorations have reinstated many of the original interior and design features.

See also
New Synagogue Zilina website
Lipót Baumhorn's plan 1920s

References
Notes

Sources

 Anon (n.d.). "Neological Synagogue" in Žilina Official Tourist Portal, accessed 23 November 2014.
 Anon (2007). "History of Jews in Žilina" in KehilaZilina website, accessed 23 November 2014.
 Borský, Maroš (2007). Synagogue Architecture in Slovakia: Towards Creating a Memorial Landscape of Lost Community. PhD dissertation, Hochschule für Jüdische Studien, Heidelberg. Accessed 23 November 2014.
 Dulla, Matúš (2004). "Posledná synagóga : vznik a podoba synagógy Neológov v Žiline od Petra Behrensa [The last synagogue: on the origin and form of the Neolog synagogue in Žilina by Peter Behrens]" (in Slovak). Architektúra a urbanizmus (Bratislava), v. 38, 3–4, pp. 199–215.
 Ďuriníková, Anna (2012). Neologická synagóga v Žiline. Bachelors dissertation thesis (in Czech), Masaryk University, Brno. Accessed 23 November 2014.

Synagogues in Slovakia
Buildings and structures in Žilina Region
Neolog Judaism synagogues
Reform synagogues
Synagogues completed in 1931
20th-century architecture in Slovakia
1931 establishments in Slovakia
Modernist architecture in Slovakia